Agshin Aligulu Alizade (May 22, 1937 in Baku – May 3, 2014 in Baku) was a Soviet and Azerbaijani composer, People's Artist of the Azerbaijani SSR (1987).

Alizade made a significant contribution to the development of the Azerbaijani ballet. He was the creator of the first in Azerbaijan heroic epic ballet "Babak", established in 1979 on the poem by Ilya Selvinsky (premiered in 1986). The next ballet "Journey to the Caucasus", which reflected the events of the history of Azerbaijan and the image of the poet Khurshidbanu Natavan and the French writer Alexandre Dumas, embodied the vital problems of modern history, as if expressing the principle of "the past in the present." The same trend projections of past events in modern life emerged in the last one-act ballet "Waltz of Hope."

Alizade headed the Union of Composers of Azerbaijan, was the Secretary of the Union of Soviet Composers. People's Artist of Azerbaijan SSR, laureate of State Prize (1978)

Works 
Ballets
 Babek (1979)
 Travel to Caucasus (2002)
 Hope Waltz (2008)
Compositions for symphonic orchestra
 Symphony No. 1
 Symphony No. 2: Chamber Symphony
 Symphony No. 3
 Symphony No. 4: Alla Mugham
 Symphony No. 5
 Concerto for violin and orchestra
 Poem for cello and orchestra

References

1937 births
2014 deaths
Musicians from Baku
Azerbaijani composers
Azerbaijani music educators
Soviet composers
Soviet male composers
20th-century male musicians
Honored Art Workers of the Azerbaijan SSR